EB 84 is a 1984 album by The Everly Brothers, and the duo's first album of new material in 11 years.

Track listing
"On the Wings of a Nightingale" (Paul McCartney) - 2:33 (US #50, UK #41)
"Danger Danger" (Frankie Miller) - 3:26
"The Story of Me" (Jeff Lynne) - 4:11
"I'm Takin' My Time" (Rick Beresford, Pat Alger) - 2:46
"The First in Line" (Paul Kennerley) - 2:57
"Lay Lady Lay" (Bob Dylan) - 3:14
"Following the Sun" (Don Everly) - 3:31
"You Make It Seem So Easy" (Don Everly) - 3:12
"More Than I Can Handle" (Pete Wingfield, Mike Vernon) - 2:58
"Asleep" (Don Everly) - 4:10

Personnel
Don Everly – vocals, acoustic guitar
Phil Everly – vocals, acoustic guitar
Dave Edmunds – additional guitar on "On the Wings of a Nightingale", additional bass
Albert Lee – guitar
Jeff Lynne – bass, arrangements
Paul McCartney – additional guitar on "On the Wings of a Nightingale"
Gerry Conway – drums
Philip Donnelly – guitar
John Giblin – bass
Gerry Hogan – pedal steel
Richard Tandy – arranger, additional keyboards
Terry Williams – drums
Pete Wingfield – keyboards
Technical
Carey Taylor - engineer
Ed Caraeff - photography, design

Charts

Sales and certifications

References

1984 albums
The Everly Brothers albums
Albums produced by Dave Edmunds
Mercury Records albums